Steven Joseph Davisson (November 27, 1957 – September 19, 2021) was an American politician and pharmacist. He was a Republican member of the Indiana House of Representatives from 2010 until his death.

Davisson died from cancer at his home in Salem, Indiana, on September 19, 2021, at age 63.

References

1957 births
2021 deaths
21st-century American politicians
American pharmacists
Deaths from cancer in Indiana
Place of birth missing
Republican Party members of the Indiana House of Representatives
People from Salem, Indiana
Purdue University alumni